Armstrongite (CaZr[Si6O15]·3H2O) is a silicate mineral.

Discovery and occurrence
It was first described in 1973 from an occurrence at Dorozhnyi pegmatite, Khanbogd District, Ömnögovi Province, Mongolia.  It was named for the American astronaut Neil Armstrong.

References 

Calcium minerals
Hydrates
Phyllosilicates
Monoclinic minerals
Zirconium minerals
Neil Armstrong